The 2016/17 FIS Ski Jumping Continental Cup was the 26th in a row (24th official) Continental Cup winter season in ski jumping for men and the 13th for ladies. This is also the 15th summer continental cup season for men and 9th for ladies.

Other competitive circuits this season included the World Cup, Grand Prix, FIS Cup, FIS Race and Alpen Cup.

Map of continental cup hosts
All 23 locations hosting continental cup events in summer (7 for men / 2 for ladies) and in winter (15 for men / 1 for ladies) this season.

 Men
 Ladies
 Men & Ladies

Men

Summer

Winter

Ladies

Summer

Winter

Men's standings

Summer

Winter

Overall (summer + winter)

Ladies' standings

Summer

Winter

Overall (summer + winter)

Participants 
Overall, total of 26 countries for both men and ladies participated in this season:

Europa Cup vs. Continental Cup 
Last two seasons of Europa Cup in 1991/92 and 1992/93 are recognized as first two Continental Cup seasons by International Ski Federation, although Continental Cup under this name officially started first season in 1993/94 season.

References

FIS Ski Jumping Continental Cup
2016 in ski jumping
2017 in ski jumping